Highland Hospital is located in Rochester, New York, and is an affiliate of the University of Rochester Medical Center (URMC), which is part of the University of Rochester.

Founded in 1889, the hospital is involved in specialties such as bariatric surgery, joint replacement, geriatric care, women's services and maternity. The organization has 261 beds and 2,400 employees.

References

Hospital buildings completed in 1889
Hospitals in Rochester, New York
1889 establishments in New York (state)